The 1942 NC State Wolfpack football team was an American football team that represented North Carolina State University as a member of the Southern Conference (SoCon) during the 1942 college football season. In its sixth season under head coach Williams Newton, the team compiled a 4–4–2 record (3–1–2 against SoCon opponents) and was outscored by a total of 142 to 70.

Schedule

References

NC State
NC State Wolfpack football seasons
NC State Wolfpack football